Asota contorta is a species of noctuoid moths in the family Erebidae first described by Per Olof Christopher Aurivillius in 1894. It is found on Bali, Java, Sumatra and in Peninsula Malaysia.

The wingspan is 59–62 mm.

References

Moths of Asia
Aganainae
Moths described in 1894